Mohamed Louhkiar (born 1 December 1983 in Besançon) is a French professional footballer. He currently plays in the Championnat de France amateur for Besançon RC.

Louhkiar played at the professional level in Ligue 2 for FC Gueugnon.

1983 births
Living people
French footballers
Ligue 2 players
Racing Besançon players
FC Gueugnon players
Sportspeople from Besançon
Association football midfielders
Footballers from Bourgogne-Franche-Comté